Colin Peter Metson (born 2 July 1963) is a former English cricketer.

He was described by Dickie Bird as "the best wicketkeeper I have seen in England since Alan Knott".

Metson started his career at Middlesex where he was an understudy to Paul Downton, appearing only when Downton was on international duty from 1981 until 1986. He joined Glamorgan in 1987 to get more game time and soon became their first choice wicketkeeper.

Personal
Metson studied Economic History at Durham University, graduating in 1985. He was the managing director of Cricket of Glamorgan County Cricket Club (2010–2012) and was appointed Community and Cricket Development manager on 14 February 2012.

References

 Colin Metson, an ex-county wicketkeeper and current committee member, is set to head Glamorgan's coaching staff.
 Colin Metson appointed Community and Cricket Development manager - BBC 14 February 2012

External links
 

1963 births
Living people
English cricketers
Glamorgan cricketers
Middlesex cricketers
Managing Directors of Cricket
People educated at Enfield Grammar School
Wales National County cricketers
Wales National County cricket captains
Marylebone Cricket Club cricketers
People from Goffs Oak
Alumni of the College of St Hild and St Bede, Durham
Wicket-keepers